Jacques Roulot (18 November 1933 – 15 February 2002) was a French fencer. He competed in the individual and team sabre events at the 1956 and 1960 Summer Olympics.

References

External links
 

1933 births
2002 deaths
French male sabre fencers
Olympic fencers of France
Fencers at the 1956 Summer Olympics
Fencers at the 1960 Summer Olympics
Fencers from Paris